Lene Christensen may refer to:

Lena Christensen, Thai-Danish actress, television presenter, and singer
Lene Christensen (footballer) (born 2000), Danish footballer